Semicircle (stylised as SEMICIRCLE) is the fifth studio album by English band The Go! Team. It was released on 19 January 2018 by Memphis Industries. Vocals on the album were provided by band members Ninja and Maki, with guest vocals from the Detroit Youth Choir, Julie Margat, Darenda Weaver, and Amber Arcades. Brass was provided by the Neon Saints Brass Band.

Accolades

Track listing

Personnel
Credits for Semicircle adapted from album liner notes.

The Go! Team
 Sam Dook
 Ninja
 Simone Odaranile
 Ian Parton
 Angela Won-Yin Mak

Additional musicians
 Amber Arcades – vocals on "The Answer's No – Now What's the Question?" and "Plans Are Like a Dream U Organise"
 Detroit Youth Choir – vocals on "Mayday", "Semicircle Song", "All the Way Live", "She's Got Guns" and "Getting Back Up"
 Doreen Kirchner – vocals on "The Answer's No – Now What's the Question?"
 Julie Margat – vocals on "Hey!"
 Darenda Weaver – vocals on "The Answer's No – Now What's the Question?"

Production
 Matt Colton – mastering
 Ian Parton – mixing, production
 Paul "P-Dub" Walton – mixing

Artwork and design
 Luke Insect – graphic design
 James Slater – art direction
 Annick Wolfers – cover photograph

Charts

References

External links
 
 

2018 albums
The Go! Team albums